The men's Greco-Roman 76 kilograms is a competition featured at the 1999 World Wrestling Championships, and was held at the Peace and Friendship Stadium in Piraeus, Athens, Greece from 23 to 25 September 1999.

Results
Legend
R — Retired

Preliminary round

Pool 1

Pool 2

Pool 3

Pool 4

Pool 5

Pool 6

Pool 7

Pool 8

Pool 9

Pool 10

Pool 11

Pool 12

Knockout round

References

Men's Greco-Roman 76 kg